Natimuk railway station was a railway station located in Natimuk on the Carpolac railway line. It was opened in  1894 when the line was extended from East Natimuk to Goroke and officially closed in 1986 however the last train to run through the railway station was in February.  Today all that remains of the station are the grain silos and some sleepers.

References 

Disused railway stations in Victoria (Australia)